Michael O'Neill (born May 29, 1951) is an American actor.

Early life and education
O'Neill was born and raised in Montgomery, Alabama. He attended Capitol Heights Junior High and Robert E. Lee High School, graduating in 1969. In high school he played basketball and was elected class beau and a class favorite. He graduated from Auburn University in 1974. While at Auburn, O'Neill was inducted as a brother of Lambda Chi Alpha. After attending Auburn, he spent time under the tutelage of actor Will Geer and one of Geer's daughters, the actress Ellen Geer, at Theatricum Botanicum in Los Angeles before moving to New York to pursue his career there.

Career
With a career stretching through three decades, he usually portrays senior law enforcement or military officers. He played Special Agent Ron Butterfield, the head of President Josiah Bartlet's Secret Service detail, on The West Wing, and CTU Administrative Director Richard Walsh in the first two episodes of 24. He played Sgt. Maj. Ron Cheals in CBS' action drama series The Unit. He starred in the Season 6 two-part finale of Grey's Anatomy as Gary Clark, the broken widower who holds the hospital hostage with a 9mm while pursuing the doctors responsible for unplugging his wife's life support. He portrayed Nick Ford on the second season of Bates Motel, and Alan Sparks on Extant. His most notable film performances occur in Seabiscuit, Secondhand Lions, Transformers, Dancer, Texas Pop. 81, Traffic, Sea of Love, A Quiet Little Marriage, Nothing but the Truth, Green Zone, J. Edgar (directed by Clint Eastwood), and Dallas Buyers Club.

Personal life
O'Neill splits his time between Los Angeles and Birmingham, Alabama, where he lives with his wife, Mary, and three daughters, Ella, Annie, and Molly.

Filmography

Film

Television

References

External links
 

1951 births
Living people
American male film actors
American male television actors
Auburn University alumni
20th-century American male actors
21st-century American male actors
People from Auburn, Alabama
Male actors from Alabama